Michel Kichka (born 1954 in Liège, Belgium) is an Israeli cartoonist and illustrator of Belgian origin. His father was Holocaust survivor Henri Kichka.

Biography
Michel Kichka was born in Belgium to Henri Kichka, a Holocaust survivor, and his wife, Lucia (née Świerczyński). He immigrated to Israel in 1974 and studied art at the Bezalel Academy, where he became an instructor and one of Israel's leading comic book artists and political cartoonists. Students he trained in the field include Rutu Modan and Uri Fink. Kichka produces comics in French and Hebrew  for various media outlets including Le Monde and TV5.

Awards and recognition
Kichka won the Israeli Dosh Cartoonist Award in 2008. In 2006 he joined the UNRIC movement Cartooning for Peace. In 2011 he was granted the prestigious Chevalier Des Arts Et Des Lettres honor by the French Culture Ministry. Kichka serves as head of the Israel Cartoonists Guild.

See also
Israeli art

References

External links
Michel Kichka official homepage.

1954 births
Living people
Artists from Liège
Israeli cartoonists
Chevaliers of the Ordre des Arts et des Lettres
Belgian emigrants to Israel
Belgian Jews